The Queensland Photo identification card serves as an identity photo card for residents of Queensland, who are aged over 15 years.  While it is now available to drivers and non-drivers, it was originally created for people who did not have a driver's licence.  It displays the holder's name, address (optional), date of birth and signature.

References

Identity documents of Australia
Society in Queensland